Pinodytes is a genus of eyeless soil fungivore beetles in the family Leiodidae. There are at least 40 described species in Pinodytes.

Species

References

Further reading

 
 
 
 

Leiodidae